The 2021 Monaco ePrix was a Formula E electric car race held at the Circuit de Monaco on 8 May 2021. It marked the seventh round of the 2020–21 Formula E season, as well as the fourth edition of the biennial event, albeit with a significantly modified layout resembling the one used in Formula One. António Félix da Costa won the race from pole, with Robin Frijns and Mitch Evans rounding out the podium.

Classification

Qualifying

Notes:
  – Norman Nato received a two-place grid penalty for failing to respect a double-waved yellow flag in free practice 1.
  – Nyck de Vries received a 40-place grid penalty for changing the powerbox and the gearbox. As he qualified 23rd and could only drop one position, he had to serve a 10-second stop-go penalty at the start of the race.

Race

Notes:
  – Pole position.
  – Fastest in group stage.
  – Fastest lap.
  – André Lotterer received a post-race 5-second time penalty for causing a collision.

Standings after the race

Drivers' Championship standings

Teams' Championship standings

 Notes: Only the top five positions are included for both sets of standings.

Notes

References

|- style="text-align:center"
|width="35%"|Previous race:2021 Valencia ePrix
|width="30%"|FIA Formula E World Championship2020–21 season
|width="35%"|Next race:2021 Puebla ePrix
|- style="text-align:center"
|width="35%"|Previous race:2019 Monaco ePrix
|width="30%"|Monaco ePrix
|width="35%"|Next race:2022 Monaco ePrix
|- style="text-align:center"

2021
2020–21 Formula E season
Eprix
May 2021 sports events in Europe